The Daughters of Divine Love Congregation, a Catholic pontifical and international order of religious women was founded by Bishop Godfrey Mary Paul Okoye on July 16, 1969, in Nigeria, during the Nigerian Civil War (Biafra War). The congregation has over 900 sisters ministering in 15 countries around the world. The members pronounce the public vows of chastity, poverty and obedience, and dedicate themselves to contemplation and apostolic work. The congregation, recognized by their blue veil, serves in the following countries:
Africa: Cameroon, Gabon, Kenya, Mali, Nigeria, Chad
Europe: England, Austria, Germany, Italy, Switzerland, Belgium
Americas: Cuba, Jamaica, Haiti, United States

Retreat houses and conference centers
In addition to their various other missionary activities and convents in 15 countries, the sisters operate a retreat house and conference center near Abuja, the capital of Nigeria, which has been used by the Catholic Bishops' Conference of Nigeria for their meetings.

References

External links
 Official website for the Daughters of Divine Love

Christian organizations established in 1969
Catholic Church in Nigeria
Catholic religious institutes established in the 20th century